Puppet Master is a comic book series written by Shawn Gabborin and published monthly by Action Lab Comics. It is the continuing story of the puppets created by André Toulon.

Plot
In the story, a group of friends using the abandoned Bodega Bay Inn as a party spot are attacked by Blade, Pinhead, and other puppets.

When a group of friends sets out to use the abandoned Bodega Bay Inn as a party spot, they find out first-hand that the bizarre local folklore is more truth than fantasy as an army of twisted autonomous Puppets have their way with the trespassing teens!

The Bodega Bay party goes sour when a dead body turns up. Now, as the remaining teens search the Inn for their missing friends, the Puppets increase the body count! But are the Puppets working on their own accord or is there a new Master in the shadows? The Puppets are back, and they're out for blood!

Storylines 
The Offering (Puppet Master issues 1 - 3)
Rebirth (Puppet Master issues 4 - 7)
Halloween 1988 (Puppet Master Halloween Special #1)
Boy of Wood (Puppet Master issues 8 -11)
Blood Debt (Puppet Master issues 12-15)
Vacancy (Puppet Master issues 16-18)
Halloween 1989 "The Creature" (Puppet Master Halloween Special #2)
Retro Now (Puppet Master issues 19-20)
Curtain Call (Puppet Master issues 21-23)

Collected editions
The first three issues of Puppet Mastery have been collected in the following trade paperbacks:

References

Horror comics
2015 in comics